Kemecse is a town in Szabolcs-Szatmár-Bereg county, in the Northern Great Plain region of eastern Hungary.

Geography

International relations

Twin towns – Sister cities
Kemecse is twinned with:

  Lăzarea, Romania

References

External links 

  in Hungarian

Populated places in Szabolcs-Szatmár-Bereg County